Brandon Anesu Mavuta (born 4 March 1997) is a Zimbabwean cricketer who plays for the Zimbabwe national cricket team. In January 2016, he was named in Zimbabwe's squad for the 2016 Under-19 Cricket World Cup. He made his international debut for Zimbabwe in July 2018.

Domestic career
Mavuta made his first-class debut on 2 March 2016 in the Logan Cup tournament. He made his Twenty20 debut for Zimbabwe against Eastern Province in the 2016 Africa T20 Cup on 30 September 2016. He made his List A debut for Zimbabwe A against Afghanistan A during Afghanistan's tour to Zimbabwe on 5 February 2017.

Mavuta was the leading wicket-taker in the 2017–18 Logan Cup for Rising Stars, with 27 dismissals in seven matches. He was also the leading wicket-taker in the 2017–18 Pro50 Championship for the Rising Stars, with fifteen dismissals in nine matches. This included taking eight wickets for 38 runs in the final of the tournament, leading the Rising Stars to their first title.

In October 2018, Mavuta was named in Durban Heat's squad for the first edition of the Mzansi Super League T20 tournament. In December 2020, he was selected to play for the Rhinos in the 2020–21 Logan Cup.

International career
In February 2017, Mavuta was named in an academy squad by Zimbabwe Cricket to tour England later that year. In January 2018, he was named in Zimbabwe' One Day International (ODI) squad for the tri-series in Bangladesh, but he did not play.

In June 2018, Mavuta was named in a Board XI team for warm-up fixtures ahead of the 2018 Zimbabwe Tri-Nation Series. Later the same month, he was named in a 22-man preliminary Twenty20 International (T20I) squad for the tri-nation series. He made his T20I debut for Zimbabwe against Australia on 6 July 2018.

In September 2018, Mavuta was named in Zimbabwe's squad for the 2018 Africa T20 Cup tournament. The same month he was once again named in Zimbabwe's ODI squad, this time for the series against South Africa. He made his ODI debut for Zimbabwe against South Africa on 30 September 2018. The same month, he was also named in Zimbabwe's Test squad for their series against Bangladesh. He made his Test debut for Zimbabwe against Bangladesh on 3 November 2018 and took 4 wickets for only 21 runs in the second innings of his debut.

References

External links
 

1997 births
Living people
Zimbabwean cricketers
Zimbabwe Test cricketers
Zimbabwe One Day International cricketers
Zimbabwe Twenty20 International cricketers
Durban Heat cricketers
Mid West Rhinos cricketers
Rising Stars cricketers
Zimbabwean cricket captains
Zimbabwean Under-19 ODI captains